The Sabah section of the Federal Route 1, Asian Highway Route AH150, is a 428-km federal highway in Sabah, Malaysia, which is also a component of the larger Pan Borneo Highway network. The route was formed in 1996 during the merging of two former routes A1 (northern route, from Kota Kinabalu to Kudat) and A2 (southern route, from Kota Kinabalu to Sindumin near the Sabah-Sarawak border). The merging of the former routes formed an alternate route of Route 1 within the city of Kota Kinabalu. However, most maps still use the older route numbering scheme by referring to the northern section as A1 and the southern section as A2.

Generally, the highway runs along the west coast of Sabah. The highway continues as the Federal Route 1 (Sarawak) at the Sabah-Sarawak border.

One interesting feature about this federal highway is motorists crossing the Sabah-Sarawak border through the Federal Route 1 must pass through a customs and immigration checkpoint at Sindumin, even though the two neighbouring states are part of the federation of Malaysia.

List of interchanges

Northern route (former A1 section)

Southern route (former A2 section)

See also
 Pan Borneo Highway
 Malaysia Federal Route 1 (Sarawak)
 Malaysia Federal Route 22
 Malaysia Federal Route 13 (Sabah)

References

Highways in Malaysia
Roads in Sabah